Dino Ferrari (May 29, 1914 – September 15, 2000) was an Italian painter. He was born and died in Ascoli Piceno.

Works

Directory of museums that contain his works
 Assalto alla Città, oil on panel, Gallery of Modern Art of the Palazzo Pitti, Florence, 1958
 Veduta del Salone della Vittoria, oil on panel, Pinacoteca Civica in Ascoli Piceno, 1935
 Veduta di paese, oil on canvas, Pinacoteca Civica in Ascoli Piceno, 1955
 Veduta architettonica con figure, oil on panel, Pinacoteca Civica in Ascoli Piceno, 1962
 Figura di donna, oil on canvas, Pinacoteca Civica in Ascoli Piceno, 1962

Public works 
 I tre Regni, fresco, central apse of the church of Sacro Cuore in Ascoli Piceno, 1955
 Nozze di Cana, fresco, church of Santa Maria of Petritoli, 1958
 Le tre chiese, la Militante, la Purgante, la Trionfante, fresco, church of Santa Maria in Petritoli, 1958
 Sant'Antonio da Padova, oil on canvas, church of Sant'Antonio in Castel di Lama, 1972
 Crocifissione, acrylic on panel (240X350), church of Sant'Antonio in Castel di Lama, 1981
 Cristo risorto, acrylic on panel (220x180), church of Sant'Antonio in Castel di Lama, 1981
 Cristo tra i malati, acrylic on panel (190x300), Auditorium CARISAP in Ascoli Piceno, 2000
 Crocifissione con predella raffigurante la Via Crucis, acrylic on panel (245x300), Auditorium CARISAP in Ascoli Piceno, 2000

Works in private collections 
 Vanità di donne, 1984, acrylic on canvas (Milan, private collection). The painting represents one of the outcomes for the search for the ultimate Ferrari
 A teatro, 1973, oil on masonite 40x30 (Ascoli Piceno private collection)

Prizes 
 50 Poeti per 50 Pittori, premio speciale, Rome, 1975
 Force, Assessorato al turismo della Regione Marche, Force, 1976
 Quercia d'Oro 82, premio nazionale della cultura, Rome, 1982
 S. Benedetto 82, San Benedetto del Tronto, 1982
 Oscar Italia 1982, Viareggio
 Quercia d'Oro 83, premio nazionale, Rome, 1983
 Biennale Internazionale della Critica 1983, Latina
 Europa 83, Galleria d'Arte Moderna Alba, Ferrara, 1983
 Gran Sigillo d'Europa London 1983, London
 Europeo della cultura, Republic of San Marino, 1983
 Nazioni Aquila d'Oro
 Galleria d'Arte Moderna Alba, Ferrara, 1984
 Bologna 1984, Bologna
 David 1984, Galleria d'Arte Moderna Alba, Ferrara
 Alba 1985, Galleria d'Arte Moderna Alba, Ferrara
 Città di New York, premio internazionale, Galleria d'Arte Moderna Alba, Ferrara, 1987
 Trofeo d'Oro 1987, Galleria d'Arte Moderna Alba, Ferrara
 VIP 1988, Galleria d'Arte Moderna Alba, Ferrara

Exhibitions 
 Collettiva, Palazzo degli Studi di Recanati, 1935, Recanati
 Collettiva di arte sacra, Presidenza Diocesana, 1953, Livorno
 Collettiva “VI Premio Nazionale di Pittura Golfo della Spezia”, (with Mario Sironi, Carla Accardi, Gerardo Dottori, Felice Casorati, Ottone Rosai, Mino Maccari, Emilio Vedova), 1954, La Spezia
 Collettiva “Rassegna d'arte italiana”, Graphil Galerie, 1963, Amsterdam
 Personale di grafiche e collages, Galleria d'Arte Nuove Proposte, 1974, Ascoli Piceno
 Personale di opere grafiche, Galleria Open Art, 1987, San Benedetto del Tronto

External links 
  
 Ascoli Piceno, "Un'esperienza a parte: la pittura di Dino Ferrari", il Quotidiano, September 10, 2007

1914 births
2000 deaths
20th-century Italian painters
Italian male painters
20th-century Italian male artists